Richard Joseph Healy (1922-2013) was an Australian rugby league footballer who played in the 1940s.

Healy was graded at St. George in 1945 and was mainly the Reserve Grade prop forward during his career although he did play 33 first grade games with the club.

After his marriage in 1948, he moved out of the area and due to residential rules of the time he was told to play with Eastern Suburbs by the NSWRFL, playing one season with the tri-colours in 1949.

Healy died on 5 November 2013.

References

St. George Dragons players
Rugby league props
Sydney Roosters players
Australian rugby league players
2013 deaths
1921 births